Dehnow-e Ludab (also Romanized as Dehnow-e Lūdāb; also known as Dehnow) is a village in Ludab Rural District, Ludab District, Boyer-Ahmad County, Kohgiluyeh and Boyer-Ahmad Province, Iran. At the 2006 census, its population was 397, in 84 families.

References 

Populated places in Boyer-Ahmad County